Tujhe Dekha Toh is a song played in Dilwale Dulhania Le Jayenge. It was one of the notable work by Lata Mangeshkar in 1990s.

Background 
It was played amidst the mustard flower and was shot in Gurgaon.

Versions 
The song has been played in Burj Khalifa during the celebration of birthday of Shah Rukh Khan. Actor Ayushmann Khurrana celebrated 27 years of Dilwale Dulhania Le Jayenge by mimicking this song. Shah Rukh Khan sang this song at Red Sea Film Festival. Ranu Mondal sang this song in a reality show. The song has been also released in Bhojpuri language. Fans of Shah Rukh Khan from Kenya sang this song.

Awards and nominations 

 Anand Bakshi got Filmfare Award for Best Lyricist for this song  in 1996
 Kumar Sanu nominated for Filmfare Award for Best Male Playback Singer
 One of the 100 Greatest Bollywood Song of All Time by BBC Asian Network
 Voted song of the year

References 

Lata Mangeshkar songs